Alamohan Das was an industrialist in pre-independence and post-independence Bengal. He ventured into various industries like jute, cotton, heavy  machinery, drug, banking etc. He is known for his role in the India Machinery Company, one of the earliest indigenous machine making industries of India.

Early life
Alamohan Das was born in a middle-clas peasant family in Khila-Baruipur, Howrah district of West Bengal, India. He had little formal education as a child, except attending a village pathshala and a middle primary school. But  as he hailed from a business minded Mahishya family, he came to Kolkata at the age of 15 and started his business career by selling parched rice, small things, but gradually switched over to industrial items. He started to read avidly to acquire knowledge for his betterment and fulfilling his ambitions. He was very much influenced by Bankim Chandra's Anandamath and Tagore's   'Banglar Mati Banglar Jwal'. He took the spirit of Swadeshi movement in his heart.

India Machinery Co.
In 1930, he founded the India Machinery Co., which, according to Government reports, was one of the few companies that produced machines of grade 1 category. Amongst the products of the company were lathes, weighing machines, textile manufacturing machines, and printing machines. In 1937 he started Bharat Jute Mill.

Political career
In independent India's first election in 1951, he won a seat in the West Bengal state assembly, contesting as an independent candidate from Amta (Vidhan Sabha constituency).

See also 

 Dasnagar railway station
 Khila Gopimohan Siksha Sadan

References

Indian industrialists
20th-century Indian businesspeople
Businesspeople in metals
Businesspeople in steel
People from Howrah district
Businesspeople from Kolkata
Indian bankers
1895 births
1969 deaths
West Bengal politicians